Storm Front is the eleventh studio album by American singer-songwriter Billy Joel, released on October 17, 1989. It was Joel's third album to reach No. 1 in the U.S. and features "We Didn't Start the Fire", a fast-paced song that cataloged a list of historical events, trends, and cultural icons from 1949 (when Joel was born) until 1989, which was Joel's third Billboard No. 1 hit.

"I Go to Extremes", a song describing the ups and downs of his emotional life, placed at No. 6. Other songs that placed in the top 100 were "And So It Goes" (No. 37), "The Downeaster 'Alexa'" (No. 57), and "That's Not Her Style" (No. 77). The album was also nominated for five Grammy Awards. The album's cover depicts the maritime storm warning flag indicating wind forces 10–12, the highest intensity on the Beaufort scale.  Joel has stated in recent Sirius XM segments that he was inspired by Peter Gabriel's 1986 track "Sledgehammer", as an inspiration for the "driving rhythm section" when he was writing the title track.

Notable cover versions 
In 1991, Garth Brooks recorded "Shameless" on his album Ropin' the Wind. Brooks' cover version was also released as a single and reached the top of the US country charts, and also entered the UK Singles Chart.

Track listing 
All songs written by Billy Joel.

Side one
"That's Not Her Style" – 5:10
"We Didn't Start the Fire" – 4:50
"The Downeaster 'Alexa'" – 3:44
"I Go to Extremes" – 4:23
"Shameless" – 4:26

Side two

"Storm Front" – 5:17
"Leningrad" – 4:06
"State of Grace" – 4:30
"When in Rome" – 4:44
"And So It Goes" – 3:38

Personnel 
Storm Front marked a radical change in Joel's backing band. Since his last studio album (The Bridge), both Russell Javors and Doug Stegmeyer, long-time members of Joel's band, were discharged from their respective duties as rhythm guitarist and bass guitarist. Javors was replaced with Joey Hunting for the record and by Tommy Byrnes on tour while Stegmeyer was replaced by Schuyler Deale. Band regulars Liberty DeVitto, David Brown and Mark Rivera were retained. Joel also hired the percussionist and multi-instrumentalist Crystal Taliefero beginning with this album.

 Billy Joel – vocals, acoustic piano (1, 4, 7, 8, 10), clavinet (2, 3, 6), percussion (2), accordion (3), Hammond organ (4, 6, 9), harpsichord (5), organ (8), synthesizers (10)
 Jeff Jacobs – synthesizers (1–9), backing vocals (1), horn arrangements (6)
 David Brown – lead guitar (1–9), MIDI guitar solo (6)
 Joey Hunting – rhythm guitar (2)
 Schuyler Deale – bass guitar (1–9)
 Liberty DeVitto – drums (1–9), percussion (2)
 Crystal Taliefero – backing vocals (1, 2, 5, 6, 9), percussion (2)

Additional musicians
 Don Brooks – harmonica (1)
 Kevin Jones – keyboard programming (2)
 John Mahoney – keyboards (2), keyboard programming (7)
 Doug Kleeger – sounds effects (2), arrangements (2)
 Sammy Merendino – electronic percussion (2)
 Dominic Cortese – accordion (3, 7)
 Itzhak Perlman – violin (3)
 Lenny Pickett – saxophone (6, 9)
 The Memphis Horns (6):
 Andrew Love – saxophone
 Wayne Jackson – trombone, trumpet 
 Arif Mardin – orchestral arrangement (7)
 Frank Floyd – backing vocals (1, 5, 6)
 Mick Jones – backing vocals (1, 4, 8), guitar (6), guitar solo (8)
 Patricia Darcy Jones – backing vocals (1, 5, 6, 9)
 Richard Marx – backing vocals (1, 6)
 Brian Ruggles – backing vocals (1)
 Ian Lloyd – backing vocals (4, 8)
 Joe Lynn Turner – backing vocals (4, 8)
 Chuck Arnold – backing vocals (7), choral leader (7)
 Hicksville High School Chorus – backing vocals (7)
 Bill Zampino – choral arrangement (7)
 Brenda White King – backing vocals (9)
 Curtis King – backing vocals (9)

Production
 Produced by Billy Joel and Mick Jones
 Mixed by Tom Lord-Alge (tracks 1–3) and Jay Healy (tracks 3–10).
 Engineered by Jay Healy
 Assistant engineers – Dana Becker, Tim Crich, David Dorn, Suzanne Hollander, Joe Pirrera and Gary Solomon.
 Mastered by Ted Jensen at Sterling Sound (New York, NY).
 Art direction – Chris Austopchuk
 Back photo – Timothy White
 Front photo – Frank Ockenfels

Accolades

Grammy Awards 

|-
| style="width:35px; text-align:center;" rowspan="3"|1990 ||rowspan=3|"We Didn't Start the Fire" || Song of the Year || 
|-
| Record of the Year || 
|-
| Best Pop Vocal Performance, Male || 
|-
|  style="width:35px; text-align:center;" rowspan="2"|1991 || Storm Front || Best Pop Vocal Performance, Male || 
|-
| Storm Front (produced by Billy Joel and Mick Jones) || Producer of the Year (Non-Classical) ||

Charts and certifications

Weekly charts

Year-end charts

Certifications and sales

References 

1989 albums
Albums produced by Mick Jones (Foreigner)
Albums recorded at MSR Studios
Albums recorded at The Warehouse Studio
Billy Joel albums
Columbia Records albums